The Bhopal–Lucknow Express is a Tri-Weekly superfast express train service offered by West Central Railways Bhopal Division. It runs between Bhopal Junction railway station of Bhopal the capital of Madhya Pradesh and Lucknow Junction railway station, the capital of Uttar Pradesh.

Bhopal–Lucknow Express , via Allahabad, is a newly announced weekly express train of the Indian Railways, which runs between Bhopal Junction railway station of Bhopal, the capital city of Central Indian state Madhya Pradesh and Lucknow, the capital city of North Indian state Uttar Pradesh.

The train is announced in the railway budget of 2011–12.

Arrival and departure
One train depart from Bhopal every Mondays at 07:30 hrs. from platform 5 reaching Lucknow the next day at 05:40  hrs.
One train will depart from Lucknow every Wednesday at 17:20, reaching Bhopal the next day at 18:30.

Route and halts
The train will go via Allahabad & Bina–Katni Rail Route. The important halts of the train are :
 BHOPAL JUNCTION
 Vidisha
 Ganj Basoda
 Bina Junction
 Khurai
 Jeruwakheda
 Saugor
 Patharia
 Damoh
 Sagoni
 Katni Junction
 Maihar
 Satna Junction
 Manikpur
 Allahabad Junction
 Orai
 Kanpur Central
 Unnao Junction
 LUCKNOW

Coach composite

The train will consist of 23 Coaches :

 1 AC I Tier
 2 AC II Tier
 2 AC III Tier
 10 Sleeper Coaches
 5 Un Reserved
 1 Ladies/Handy Capped
 1 Luggage/Brake Van
 1 Pantry Car

Average speed and frequency

The train will run with an average speed of 53 km/h The train will run on Weekly basis.

Other trains from Bhopal to Lucknow 
12183/12184 Bhopal - Lucknow - Pratapgarh Express (Weekly)
12593/12594 Bhopal - Lucknow Garibrath Express

Trivia
 The train goes via. Bina - Katni route
 The fifth train announced in between Bhopal and Lucknow point to point.

See also
Bhopal - Damoh Intercity Express
Indore Junction
Bhopal Junction

References

Express trains in India
Railway services introduced in 2011
Rail transport in Madhya Pradesh
Passenger trains originating from Lucknow